Rafael Barbosa may refer to:

 Rafael Paula Barbosa (1926–2007), Bissau-Guinean political activist
 Rafael Barbosa (footballer, born 1983), Brazilian football defender
 Rafael Barbosa (footballer, born 1996), Portuguese football attacking midfielder